The 2015 Buenos Aires ePrix, formally the 2015 FIA Formula E Buenos Aires ePrix was a Formula E motor race held on 10 January 2015 at the Puerto Madero Street Circuit in Puerto Madero, Buenos Aires, Argentina. It was the first edition of the Buenos Aires ePrix and the fourth championship race of the single-seater, electrically powered racing car series' inaugural season. The race was won by António Félix da Costa.

Report

Background

Nick Heidfeld, Jean-Éric Vergne, and Bruno Senna were voted to receive the FanBoost (an extra 30 kW for five seconds per car).

Race
Sébastien Buemi started on pole position, with Jaime Alguersuari and Nick Heidfeld behind him. Going into the first hairpin, Heidfeld managed to brake later and overtake Alguersuari on the outside. The field seemed to be free of incidents throughout the first couple of laps, but Michela Cerruti was seen entering the pits, possibly after making contact with Bruno Senna. Meanwhile, championship leader Lucas di Grassi overtook Sam Bird for fourth position and Heidfeld deployed his FanBoost at the main straight, but he failed to take the lead from Buemi. On lap 7, di Grassi passed Alguersuari and moved up to third, and passed Heidfeld in turn five, on lap 14. Heidfeld fell further down the order when he had to use the run-off area at turn 8 and was overtaken by both Virgin drivers.

The first major incident of the race happened on lap 16, when Karun Chandhok's right-rear suspension broke and he hit the wall. Just before the race was neutralised, Heidfeld managed to take his position back from Bird, and Alguersuari was seen entering the pits with five others. Those who waited a lap to come in, including Buemi and di Grassi, were stuck behind Cerruti, because overtaking was not permitted under yellow flags. Because the safety car picked up the leader at the moment Buemi was in the pits, there was much confusion about who was in the lead. However, it was still Buemi, di Grassi, and Heidfeld at the top of the standings, so on lap 21, every driver not in the lead lap was told to pass the safety car and catch up with the rest of the field.

Green flags showed with thirteen laps to go. Almost immediately, however, the leader Buemi hit the wall on the inside of turn 8, broke his suspension and had to retire. The top three was now filled by di Grassi, Heidfeld, and Bird, but the latter quickly received a drive-through penalty for ignoring the red lights at the end of the pit lane. On lap 26, di Grassi's suspension broke in the same fashion as Chandhok's had done, sending another race leader into retirement. The safety car was not deemed to be required, because both Buemi and di Grassi had managed to park their cars safely.

The last three laps saw Jean-Éric Vergne aggressively overtaking Alguersuari for third place and Nick Heidfeld being given a drive-through penalty for going over the pit lane speed limit, making António Félix da Costa, who had been relatively invisible throughout the race, the fourth race leader in ten laps. Meanwhile, Alguersuari was being attacked by Nicolas Prost, Nelson Piquet Jr. and Daniel Abt. Vergne joined them when he missed his braking point twice and fell back from second to fifth. Abt tried to overtake Prost on the dirtier side of the track, but ended up hitting the back of Alguersuari instead and retiring with one lap to go. Félix da Costa took victory, with Prost second, Piquet third, Alguersuari fourth, and Senna fifth; Vergne had had to slow down to save energy.

Results

Qualifying

 ㄧ Jarno Trulli has been given a 10-place grid penalty for changing the gearbox

Race

Notes:
 – Three points for pole position.
 – Two points for fastest lap.
 - Ho Pin Tung has been given a drive through penalty converted into a 35-seconds time penalty for not reaching the minimum pit stop time.
 - Daniel Abt has been given a drive through penalty converted into a 35-seconds time penalty for causing a collision.
 – Salvador Durán finished in eighth position, but was disqualified for exceeding the maximum power usage.
Lap leaders: 1-22 Buemi; 23-25 di Grassi; 26-32 Heidfeld; 33-35 da Costa

Standings after the race

Drivers' Championship standings

Teams' Championship standings

 Notes: Only the top five positions are included for both sets of standings.

References

External links

 Official results

|- style="text-align:center"
|width="35%"|Previous race:2014 Punta del Este ePrix
|width="30%"|FIA Formula E Championship2014–15 season
|width="35%"|Next race:2015 Miami ePrix
|- style="text-align:center"
|width="35%"|Previous race:N/A
|width="30%"|Buenos Aires ePrix
|width="35%"|Next race:2016 Buenos Aires ePrix
|- style="text-align:center"

Buenos Aires ePrix
Buenos Aires ePrix
Buenos Aires ePrix